An emergency notification system is a method of facilitating the one-way dissemination or broadcast of messages to one or many groups of people, alerting them to a pending or existing emergency. The Emergency Notification System (ENS) was created by Dialogic Communication Corporation (DCC) in the early 1980s. DCC, including its patent portfolio, was purchased by Motorola Solutions as part of their 2018 acquisition of Airbus DS Communications.

Notification vs. communication 
Emergency notification systems constitute a (one-way communication) subset of the types of systems described by the broader term emergency communication systems which includes systems that provide one-way and two-way communications, between emergency communications staff, first responders, and impacted individuals. Mass automated dialing services such as Reverse 9-1-1, and the common town siren systems that are used to alert for tornadoes, tsunami, air-raid, etc., are examples of emergency notification systems.

Many local governments and organizations that hold large, public events adopt emergency notification systems to be able to notify large groups of people in the event of an emergency. For example, in 2013 the Dallas YMCA Thanksgiving "turkey trot" race, with over 40,000 participants, implemented an alert system called RedFlag.

Most major telecommunications providers offer Public Safety Answering Points (PSAPs) access to their subscriber data (in the areas serviced by the PSAP) in order to facilitate the effective use of one-way emergency notifications

One-click notification 
One click notification is a method of clicking one button within a mobile app or emergency notification platform to initiate the dissemination of a message. An emergency notification system is an example of one-click multimodal notification. Organizations use a one-click notification service to trigger the sending of messages via pre-saved configurations such as selected contact groups, chosen delivery methods etc.

See also
 Emergency notification app
 Emergency Alert System
 Common Alerting Protocol
 Civil defense siren
 Public safety network
 Office of Emergency Management
 Emergency management
 Emergency management information system
 Emergency management software
 Emergency control centre
 Wireless Emergency Alerts

References

 
Emergency population warning systems